This is the discography for Turkish singer, composer, lyricist, and dancer Tarkan.

Albums

Studio albums

Compilation albums

Remix albums

EP

Music videos

Other tracks

Official tracks from other albums

Tarkan's Ottoman classical music songs

Appearances

Tarkan cover songs / Tarkan song's appearances

Soundtracks

Charts

References

External links
Tarkan Album and Song Lyrics Information in English

Discographies of Turkish artists
Pop music discographies